University Lake School is an independent school in the Lake Country area of Waukesha County in Wisconsin. It opened in 1958 with 135 acres on the Vettelson farm close to the shore of Nagawicka Lake. Mrs. Vettelson deeded the land to the School on two conditions: that she be allowed to live the remainder of her life on the land and that students chop her fire wood each winter. University Lake School proudly sits on 180 acres of pristine woodland forest.

ULS has 250 pupils Pre-Kindergarten to Grade 12. Current varsity and junior varsity athletics include soccer, field hockey, volleyball, cross country, basketball, skiing, track, tennis and golf.

History 

Founding families initially summered in Lake Country from Milwaukee. After World War II they decided to become "year-rounders" and to establish a school adequate to their aims: excellent academics, small classes, preparation for the best colleges, and proximity to nature. The first board president was John M. Friend and the first Headmaster was Joseph de Peyster.

ULS was initially founded out of concern with the quality of an overcrowded public school.  Questionnaires were sent out to select families, from business leaders to small farmers; 72 families were interested, which would enroll 178 students.

Other founding officers were: Robert C. Brumder, vice-president, Robert L. Manegold, secretary.

When the school obtained its permanent residence, the executive committee of trustees were: Herbert E Brumder, Robert C. Brumder, Mr and Mrs Edward Yewer, Mr and Mrs David Pabst, Mr and Mrs Paul Hibbard.

Notable donations 

Mrs. Herbert Brumder donated $100,000 to the school in memory of her son, who died in a car accident.

References

External links
Official Website
Niche Ranking

Private elementary schools in Wisconsin
Private middle schools in Wisconsin
Private high schools in Wisconsin
Educational institutions established in 1956
Schools in Waukesha County, Wisconsin
Preparatory schools in Wisconsin
1956 establishments in Wisconsin